In the Telugu language, a chatuva is an occasional poem prompted by a specific event, person, or object. Spontaneity is the defining characteristic of the genre.

References

Indian literature
Occasional poetry